Eucalyptus ophitica, commonly known as the serpentine ironbark, is a species of small ironbark tree that is endemic to a small area of northern New South Wales. It has grey ironbark, lance-shaped adult leaves, flower buds in groups of seven, white flowers and cup-shaped, conical or hemispherical fruit.

Description

Taxonomy and naming
Eucalyptus ophitica was first formally described in 1990 by Lawrie Johnson and Ken Hill in the journal Telopea from specimens collected near Baryulgil in 1984. The specific epithet (ophitica) is from the Greek ophites, meaning "serpentine" (rock), referring to the rocks where the species is found.

Distribution and habitat
Serpentine ironbark grows in grassy woodland on hilly serpentine outcrops in the Upper Clarence.

References

ophitica
Myrtales of Australia
Flora of New South Wales
Trees of Australia
Plants described in 1990
Taxa named by Lawrence Alexander Sidney Johnson
Taxa named by Ken Hill (botanist)